Parevaza is a genus of flies in the family Stratiomyidae.

Distribution
New Guinea.

Species
Parevaza longa James, 1978

References

Stratiomyidae
Brachycera genera
Diptera of Australasia
Endemic fauna of New Guinea